James Morris (January 2, 1893 – July 20, 1980) was Attorney General of North Dakota, and a justice of the North Dakota Supreme Court from 1935 to 1964.

Born in a sod house in Bordulac, North Dakota, Morris attended high school and college in Cincinnati, receiving his law degree from the University of Cincinnati Law School. He entered the practice of law in Carrington, North Dakota, which was interrupted by service in World War II. He was appointed Assistant Attorney General in 1928, winning election to the office of Attorney General later that year. In 1934 he defeated Justice George Moellring for a seat on the North Dakota Supreme Court. Morris was reelected in 1944 and 1954, and served continuously except for a year-long leave of absence to accept an appointment from President Harry Truman to serve as a trial judge for a War Crimes Tribunal in Germany following World War II. He did not serve as a judge for the more famous Nuremberg trials, but served on a tribunal for the trial of twenty-three officials of I.G. Farben Industries.

He died in Bismarck, North Dakota.

References

Justices of the North Dakota Supreme Court
University of Cincinnati College of Law alumni
North Dakota Attorneys General
20th-century American judges
1893 births
1980 deaths